Arctostaphylos regismontana is a species of manzanita known by the common name Kings Mountain manzanita. It is endemic to California, where it is known from the northern slopes of the Santa Cruz Mountains in the southern San Francisco Bay Area.

It can be found in chaparral and broadleaf and coniferous forest on granite and sandstone soils.

Description
This is an erect shrub reaching over two meters in height and known to exceed four meters. It is bristly and glandular, exuding sticky resins. It has a dense foliage of curved oval-shaped leaves which are greenish in color and fuzzy and sticky in texture. They are smooth or toothed along the edges and up to 6 centimeters long.

The inflorescence is an open cluster of conical manzanita flowers each one half to one centimeter long. The fruit is a hairy, sticky drupe.

See also
Arctostaphylos andersonii

References

External links
Jepson Manual Treatment
USDA Plants Profile
Photo gallery

regismontana
Endemic flora of California
Natural history of the California chaparral and woodlands
Natural history of the California Coast Ranges
Natural history of San Mateo County, California
~
Plants described in 1933